The 2011 Friends Life t20 was the second season of the Friends Life t20, England's premier domestic Twenty20 competition. The season ran from 1 June to 27 August 2011. The teams in the tournament remained the same as the previous season.

The schedule of the tournament had been widely criticised for being too long and therefore certain games had very few fans. The ECB announced that they retained the same schedule as it generates a lot of revenue for the smaller counties.

The winner and runner-up of the tournament qualified for the 2011 Champions League Twenty20 qualifying stage.

Group stage

North Group

Table

Results

June

July

South Group

Table

Results

June

July

Knockout stage

Quarter-finals

Semi-finals

Final

Statistics

Highest team totals
The following table lists the six highest team scores in the season.

Most runs
The top five highest run scorers (total runs) in the season are included in this table.

Highest scores
This table contains the top five highest scores of the season made by a batsman in a single innings.

Most wickets
The following table contains the five leading wicket-takers of the season.

Best bowling figures
This table lists the top five players with the best bowling figures in the season.

References

External links
 Tournament Site - CricInfo

Friends Life t20
Friends Life t20
2011
Friends Life t20